Epipsestis nikkoensis is a moth of the family Drepanidae first described by Shōnen Matsumura in 1921. It is found in the Chinese provinces of Jilin, Shaanxi and Hubei and in Japan, Taiwan, the Russian Far East, Nepal, Bhutan, Myanmar, the Korean Peninsula, Thailand and northern Vietnam.

References

Moths described in 1921
Thyatirinae
Moths of Japan
Taxa named by Shōnen Matsumura